The Marquis of Bolibar (German: Der Marquis von Bolibar) is a 1922 Austrian silent film directed by Friedrich Porges and starring Hans Schindler. It is based on the 1920 novel of the same title by Leo Perutz.

The film's sets were designed by the art director Artur Berger, Hans Rouc and Julius von Borsody.

Cast
Hans Schindler as Marquis von Bolibar 
Josef Überacker as Oberst 
Otto Schmöle as Salignac 
Ida Koór as Monjita 
Karl Miksch as Maultiertreiber Perico 
Joe Lars as Captain Egloffstern 
Heinrich Fuchs as Lieutenant Günther 
Josef Zetenius
Stefan Pichy
Carl Lustig-Prean
Hans Brausewetter

See also
Bolibar (1928)

References

External links

Austrian silent feature films
Films directed by Friedrich Porges
Austrian black-and-white films
1922 drama films
Films based on Austrian novels
Napoleonic Wars films
Films set in Spain
1920s historical drama films
Austrian historical drama films
Silent drama films